Harbourside was a shopping centre in Darling Harbour, Sydney. Built in 1988 as part of the urban redevelopment of the Darling Harbour area during the 1980s, it was located in close proximity to other notable buildings such as the Sydney Convention and Exhibition Centre and the Australian National Maritime Museum. In December 2022, the centre closed permanently preceding its demolition. The site will be redeveloped for a mixed-use tower and retail complex.

History
Harbourside was opened on 4 May 1988 by Queen Elizabeth II, in which she formally opened the Darling Harbour redevelopment as part of the Australian Bicentennial celebrations. Sydney Aquarium was the first attraction to open and was soon followed by a host of museums, shops, restaurants, hotels and bars.

Beville Group acquired the centre for $127 million in 2004. In 2005, Harbourside underwent a full refurbishment which unveiled a new and expanded food court, an entertainment level which is home to a 20-lane Kingpin Bowling Centre, M9 Laser Skirmish and Australia's first Boeing 737-800 flight simulator, Flight Experience.

On 7 November 2013, Harbourside Shopping Centre was acquired by Mirvac for $522 million.

As part of the $3 billion project underway Mirvac planned for a significant new retail shopping centre and commercial office tower," documents, lodged with the Department of Planning & Environment as part of the Harbourside Shopping Centre development in 2015.

In August 2016 Mirvac dropped plans for an office complex at Darling Harbour and instead looked to build a taller, skinnier apartment tower as part of its proposed $400 million redevelopment of the Harbourside Shopping Centre.

In October 2020, Mirvac updated its plans for the new retail centre and apartments which will include a new public domain of over 8,200m². This redevelopment will include the demolition of the existing shopping centre and removal of the existing pedestrian bridge over Darling Drive and the old monorail station. The development will include a mixture of non-residential and residential uses, including a new shopping centre containing retail and restaurants, residential apartments and public open spaces. The centre closed on 9 December 2022 and demolition commenced in early 2023.

Tenants
Harbourside had 20,566m² of floor space. The major attractions included Kingpin bowling alley (includes M9 Laser Skirmish), Australia's first retail Jet flight simulator, RaceCentre, 9D motion moving cinema and Hard Rock Cafe (Sydney's only store).

References

External links

Darling Harbour
Defunct shopping malls
Shopping centres in Sydney
Shopping malls established in 1988
Shopping malls disestablished in 2022
1988 establishments in Australia
2022 disestablishments in Australia